Tyrnau is a former municipality in the district of Graz-Umgebung in the Austrian state of Styria. Since the 2015 Styria municipal structural reform, it is part of the municipality Fladnitz an der Teichalm, in the Weiz District.

Population

References

Graz Highlands
Cities and towns in Graz-Umgebung District